Grady Glynn Saulters Jr. (born February 10, 1945) is an American former professional basketball player born in Minden, Louisiana.

A 6'2" guard from Northeast Louisiana University (now the University of Louisiana at Monroe), Saulters competed at the 1968 Summer Olympics, where he won a gold medal with the United States national basketball team. Despite being drafted in the 12th round (152nd overall pick) of the 1968 NBA draft by the National Basketball Association's Cincinnati Royals, he played one season (1968–69) in the American Basketball Association as a member of the New Orleans Buccaneers, scoring 59 points in 22 games.

References 
 
 1968 Summer Olympics at USABasketball.com
 Louisiana Sports Hall of Fame bio

1945 births
Living people
American men's basketball players
Basketball players at the 1968 Summer Olympics
Basketball players from Louisiana
Cincinnati Royals draft picks
Louisiana–Monroe Warhawks men's basketball players
Medalists at the 1968 Summer Olympics
New Orleans Buccaneers players
Olympic gold medalists for the United States in basketball
Point guards